Home Front is a lifestyle television series that aired on TVNZ's channel Television One in New Zealand. It combines "home makeover" ideas, home maintenance and DIY tips, and guided tours around the homes of well-known New Zealanders. The series premiered on 6 July 2000 with several series of 13 episodes each.

Home Front was hosted by Jayne Kiely, Dave Cull, and Sally Ridge, each of whom covered a particular area of the show. Kiely was the primary presenter, and also presented the guided tours. Cull presented hints and advice for DIYers (do-it-yourselfers), and Ridge presented the home makeovers section of the show.

Originally hosted by Alison Mau, until she left TVNZ for Prime Television, this series was hugely successful for TV One.  A rushed reshoot, of Jayne Kiely fronting many stories previously shot using Alison Mau, added to the demise of the series when it was finally axed in 2005.

External links
 TVNZ Home Front page

References 

New Zealand reality television series
TVNZ 1 original programming
2000s New Zealand television series
2000 New Zealand television series debuts
2005 New Zealand television series endings
Gardening television